The People's Progressive Movement was a political party in Saint Vincent and the Grenadines. It contested the 2001 general elections, receiving 2.6% of the vote, but failing to win a seat. The party did not contest any further elections.

References

Political parties in Saint Vincent and the Grenadines